Josiah Tattnall may refer to:

Josiah Tattnall (politician) (1765–1803), American politician
Josiah Tattnall Sr. (1740–1803), British colonist
Josiah Tattnall III (1794–1871), American naval officer